Australian rapper Iggy Azalea has released three studio albums, five extended plays (EPs), two mixtapes and seventeen singles (including four as a featured artist). In September 2011, Azalea released her first mixtape, Ignorant Art. Following the release, Azalea signed a recording contract with T.I.'s record label Grand Hustle. In July 2012, she released a free EP entitled Glory, and in October of that year, Azalea released her second mixtape, TrapGold.

In April 2014, Azalea released her debut studio album, The New Classic, which peaked inside the top five on the record charts of countries including the United States, Australia and the United Kingdom. The first three singles from the album, "Work", "Bounce" and "Change Your Life" experienced moderate success. The fourth single, "Fancy" featuring Charli XCX, reached number one on the US Billboard Hot 100 and peaked within the top five charts of Australia and the United Kingdom. "Black Widow" featuring Rita Ora was the fifth single from The New Classic, and became a top five hit in the US and the UK. During this time, Azalea was also featured on Ariana Grande's top five single "Problem". In November 2014, Azalea released a reissue of her debut studio album titled Reclassified, which included the singles "Beg for It" and "Trouble". Azalea achieved three top ten hits simultaneously on the Billboard Hot 100 in 2014. Her second album Digital Distortion was set to be released in the summer of 2016, but was shelved. The album had been promoted with the singles "Team", "Mo Bounce", and "Switch".

In late 2017, Azalea announced she had left Def Jam Recordings and would be releasing a new project titled Surviving the Summer under a new record label in the following year, without any of the material originally intended for Digital Distortion. Azalea then released a new single, "Savior" featuring Quavo, on 1 February through Island Records. In July 2018, it was announced that the EP Survive the Summer would be released on August 3, and feature the single "Kream". On March 1, 2019 she announced that "Sally Walker" would be the lead single for her second album, In My Defense, which was released on July 19, 2019.

Studio albums

Reissues

EPs

Mixtapes

Singles

As lead artist

As featured artist

Promotional singles

Other charted songs

Guest appearances

See also
 Iggy Azalea videography
 List of songs recorded by Iggy Azalea
 List of Australian hip hop musicians
 Australian hip hop

Notes

References

Discographies of Australian artists
Electronic music discographies
Hip hop discographies
Discography